Hawthorn Corner is a hamlet near Herne Bay in Kent, England. It is part of the Herne and Broomfield civil parish and consists of a few houses and a sewage works sandwiched between the Thanet Way and the railway to Ramsgate. It is in the Reculver ward of Herne Bay.

Villages in Kent